Dead Christ Supported by Two Angels is a tempera on panel painting by Giovanni Bellini, now in the Gemäldegalerie, Berlin. It is dated to 1465–1470, as shown by similarities to his 1464 San Vincenzo Ferrer Polyptych, an early mature work.

Bibliography 
 Mariolina Olivari, Giovanni Bellini, in AA.VV., Pittori del Rinascimento, Scala, Firenze 2007. 

Paintings by Giovanni Bellini
Paintings in the Gemäldegalerie, Berlin
1470 paintings
Paintings depicting Jesus
Angels in art